Brownridge is a surname. Notable people with the surname include:

Fergus Beck Brownridge (1889–1978), Canadian politician
Jared Brownridge (born 1994), American basketball player